In mathematics – specifically, in operator theory – a densely defined operator or partially defined operator is a type of partially defined function. In a topological sense, it is a linear operator that is defined "almost everywhere".  Densely defined operators often arise in functional analysis as operations that one would like to apply to a larger class of objects than those for which they a priori "make sense".

Definition

Examples

Consider the space  of all real-valued, continuous functions defined on the unit interval; let  denote the subspace consisting of all continuously differentiable functions. Equip  with the supremum norm ; this makes  into a real Banach space.

This unboundedness causes problems if one wishes to somehow continuously extend the differentiation operator  to the whole of 

The Paley–Wiener integral, on the other hand, is an example of a continuous extension of a densely defined operator.

See also

References

 

Functional analysis
Hilbert space
Linear operators
Operator theory